Robert Stoltz (born 10 August 1976) is a Swedish football defender, currently representing Enköpings SK. 

He joined the Djurgårdens IF for the 2006 season, leaving Kalmar FF. After two seasons with the club he was put on loan to Enköpings SK for the rest of the 2008 season. Stoltz got little time on the pitch being capped only 27 times. His only goal was scored against IF Elfsborg during the 2007 season. He started his career at Lira Luleå BK in Luleå and has also represented Bodens BK.

References

1976 births
Allsvenskan players
Bodens BK players
Kalmar FF players
Djurgårdens IF Fotboll players
Living people
Swedish footballers
Association football defenders